The Portland Thirteenth Avenue Historic District is a  historic district which was listed on the National Register of Historic Places in 1987.

It included 20 contributing buildings, including work by architect William C. Knighton.

Two buildings in the district were designed by architect William C. Knighton.

Structures:
 Wadhams and Kerr Bros. Building
 Kerr Building (or Platt Electric Building)
 General Electric Supply Corp. Building (or Dynagraphics Building)
 Meier Building (or Reed Harris Building)
 Armour Building (401 NW 13th Avenue)
 Dale Building
 Swift & Co. Building (Portland Antique Co. Building)
 Simon Building (McCoy Door Building)
 Gadsby Building (1306 NW Hoyt Street)
 600 NW 14th Avenue
 Blumauer-Frank Building (or McKesson and Robbins Building)
 Crane Building
 Wool Growers Building (or Oregon School of Design/Mini-Storage Building)
 Prael, Hegele Building (or Maddox Building)
 Modern Confectionary Building (1240 NW Hoyt Street)
 Oregon Transfer Company Building
 Fisk Tire Building (or Metz Supply Building)
 Sinclair Building
 Fuller Co. Building (or Cold Storage Building), 1227 NW Davis Street

References

External links
 

National Register of Historic Places in Portland, Oregon
Pearl District, Portland, Oregon
Historic districts on the National Register of Historic Places in Oregon